1 and 2 Tai Cochion consists of a pair of joined cottages in the village of Nannerch, Flintshire, Wales.  Each of the cottages is designated by Cadw as a Grade II listed building.  They were built for the railway engineer William Barber Buddicom in 1877–88 and designed by the Chester architect John Douglas.

The cottages are built in brick in vernacular revival style with tiled hipped roofs.  Each is a mirror image of the other and they share a central chimney stack; the cottages are divided by a buttress in the lower storey.  They have gables containing a lozenge pattern in the brickwork.  Both cottages have rear extensions added in the 20th century.

See also
List of houses and associated buildings by John Douglas

References

Grade II listed buildings in Flintshire
Grade II listed houses
Houses in Flintshire
Houses completed in 1888
John Douglas buildings